Schinia imperialis is a moth of the family Noctuidae. It is found in Daghestan and Turkey.

The larvae feed on Cephalaria procera.

External links
The Noctuidae (Lepidoptera) of the Daghestan Republic (Russia)
Checklist of moths of Turkey

Schinia
Moths of Asia
Moths described in 1871